Tyree St. Louis (born May 8, 1997) is an American football offensive tackle for the Birmingham Stallions of the United States Football League (USFL). He played college football at the University of Miami, and signed with the New England Patriots as an undrafted free agent in 2019.

College career
St. Louis came out of the IMG Academy as a four-star recruit by both ESPN and Rivals and the ninth-best offensive lineman prospect in Floria state while being a top-300 high school prospect in the country. He decided to stay close to home and play his collegiate football at Miaimi over offers from Florida, Kentucky, Tennessee, and USC. As a freshman in 2015, St. Louis did not redshirt for the Hurricanes but saw most of his actions on special teams throughout the season. As a sophomore, he saw more action earning the first starts of his career as he got the nod for the final 8 games of the season at right tackle. St. Louis would go on to start the remaining 26 games of his career through his junior and senior season with 13 starts in 2017 coming at right tackle and the rest coming on the left side. He earned Honorable Mention All-ACC honors following the conclusion of the 2018 season.

Professional career
St. Louis was originally signed as an undrafted free agent by the New England Patriots. After spending a week on the Patriots practice squad, he was signed to the Indianapolis Colts practice squad on September 7 but a month later. St. Louis was subsequently signed by the Los Angeles Chargers on October 18 to their practice squad for the rest of the season.

For the 2020 season, he was named in the initial 53-man roster and made his NFL debut in the opening weekend game against the Cincinnati Bengals filling in at right guard for the injured Trai Turner.

St. Louis signed an exclusive-rights free agent tender with the Chargers on March 18, 2021. He was waived/injured on August 30, 2021 and placed on injured reserve. He was released on September 2.

St. Louis signed with the Birmingham Stallions of the United States Football League on May 9, 2022.

References

External links

1997 births
Living people
Players of American football from Tampa, Florida
American football offensive tackles
Miami Hurricanes football players
New England Patriots players
Indianapolis Colts players
Los Angeles Chargers players
Birmingham Stallions (2022) players